Christopher Levenson (born February 13, 1934, in London, England) is a Canadian poet.

Life
Levenson lived in the Netherlands and Germany, before moving to Ottawa in 1968. He became a Canadian citizen in 1973. He has received degrees from Cambridge University and the University of Iowa.

He was co-founder, and editor, of Arc, and taught for many years at Carleton University.

His work appeared in The Antigonish Review, among other journals, and he is a member of the Writers' Union of Canada.

Awards
1960 Eric Gregory Award
1987 Archibald Lampman Award

Works

Poetry

Stills. (Chatto & Windus, London, 1972).

Half Truths. (Wolsak and Wynn, 1990).

Translations

Seeking Love's Solace (Aliquando Press, 1982).

Editor
 
 
 Reconcilable Differences: The Changing Face of Poetry by Canadian Men Since 1970. (Bayeux Arts, 1994)

References

External links
 "Christopher Levenson", poets.ca
 

1934 births
Living people
20th-century Canadian poets
Canadian male poets
British emigrants to Canada
University of Iowa alumni
Academic staff of Carleton University
Dutch–English translators
Alumni of the University of Cambridge
Writers from Ottawa
21st-century Canadian poets
20th-century translators
21st-century translators
20th-century Canadian male writers
21st-century Canadian male writers